On January 16, 2023, six people, including a ten-month-old baby, were killed execution-style in a house in Goshen, California in the United States by alleged cartel gang members. Three others survived the shooting uninjured.

Background
A week prior to the shooting, a search warrant was conducted at the home, and according to the Tulare County Sheriff, deputies found drugs, ammunition and weapons. Eladio Parraz was arrested and later bailed as a result.

Shooting
The shooting occurred at around 3:30 a.m., and every person found dead had died from gunshot wounds. Two dead victims were initially found by Tulare County Sheriff's deputies, and then four more bodies were found in the house. The victims were identified as Rosa Parraz, 72; Eladio Parraz Jr., 52; Jennifer Analla, 50; Marcos Parraz, 19; Alissa Parraz, 16 and Nycholas Parraz, 10 months.

On February 3, 2023, two suspects, Noah David Beard and Angel Uriarte, were arrested.

Reward
Initially, there was a $10,000 reward offered by the Sheriff's Department to gather information on a suspect. The reward was subsequently increased to $25,000.

References

2023 mass shootings in the United States
History of Tulare County, California
January 2023 crimes in the United States
Mass shootings in California
Massacres in the United States
Massacres in 2023